Milton Early Kern (1875–1961) was an American Seventh-day Adventist educator and youth leader.

He attended Union College in Lincoln, Nebraska. From 1900 to 1904 Kern was head of the Bible and history departments at Union College. His success in working for Adventist young people led to a position as secretary of the young people's department of the Central Union Conference. At the General Conference Council held in 1907, at which the General Conference organized a "Young People's Department" he became the first chair with Matilda Erickson as the first secretary. Later in the year the new organization was named the "Young People's Missionary Volunteer Department." From 1910 to 1914 Kern was president of the Foreign Mission Seminary (now Washington Adventist University). During the 1920s he spent most of his time overseas building Missionary Volunteer Societies. In 1933 he became dean of the Advanced Bible School, which in 1936 became the Seventh-day Adventist Theological Seminary. In 1943 he became field secretary of the General Conference and chair of the Ellen G. White Estate board of trustees. He retired in 1950.

See also

References

1875 births
1961 deaths
Seventh-day Adventist religious workers
Ellen G. White Estate
American Seventh-day Adventists
Andrews University faculty
Union College (Nebraska) alumni